Polish Radio Wilno was a station of the Polish Radio, located in the city of Wilno (now Vilnius, Lithuania), which in the interbellum period belonged to the Second Polish Republic. 

Irregular daily broadcasts began on November 28, 1927, and on December 4, 1927, the station began its normal operation. Official opening ceremony took place on January 15, 1928. Original frequency was 690 kHz, but it was changed several times, and since mid-1930s, until the outbreak of World War II, the frequency was 536 kHz.

In the years 1927–1931, the station was located in Wilno’s district of Zwierzyniec. In 1931 a new transmitting station was opened in the district of Lipówka. It had one 16 kW transmitter (increased to 50 kW in 1936) and an antenna mounted between two 70 meter towers. Yet another station was under construction in the district of Krzyżówka, but the outbreak of World War II prevented its completion.

Among most popular broadcasts there was daily transmission of Roman Catholic mass services from the famous chapel of Ostra Brama.

The Lipówka station was bombed by German Luftwaffe on September 16, 1939, during Germany's Polish September Campaign.

References

See also 
Radio stations in interwar Poland
1927 in radio
Elektrit

History of Vilnius
1939 disestablishments in Poland
Radio stations disestablished in 1939
Polskie Radio
1927 establishments in Poland
Radio stations established in 1927
Mass media in Vilnius
Defunct mass media in Poland